Kent Rory Simpson (born March 26, 1992) is a Canadian former professional ice hockey goaltender who briefly played in the National Hockey League (NHL) with the Chicago Blackhawks. Simpson was selected by the Blackhawks in the second round (58th overall) of the 2010 NHL Entry Draft.

Playing career
Simpson played major junior hockey with the Everett Silvertips of the Western Hockey League (WHL). He also won a silver medal with Team Pacific at the 2009 World U-17 Hockey Challenge and represented Team Canada at the 2010 IIHF World U18 Championships.

On March 31, 2012, the Rockford IceHogs of the American Hockey League (AHL) signed Simpson to an amateur try-out agreement, allowing the goaltender to make his professional debut in the AHL before the end of the 2011–12 season. On May 29, 2012, Simpson was signed by the Chicago Blackhawks of the National Hockey League (NHL) to a three-year entry-level contract.

On October 4, 2014, Simpson was traded by the Blackhawks along with Nick Leddy to the New York Islanders in exchange for Ville Pokka, T.J. Brennan and Anders Nilsson.

On July 15, 2015, Simpson was signed to a one-year AHL contract with the Stockton Heat, continuing his stay in Stockton after the previous season with former ECHL club, the Stockton Thunder. In the 2015–16 season, Simpson split the year between the Heat and ECHL affiliate, the Adirondack Flames. As the Heat's third choice goaltender, he recorded a 3-4 record in 11 appearances.

As a free agent in the off-season from the Heat, Simpson secured a one-year AHL contract with the San Antonio Rampage, an affiliate to the Colorado Avalanche, on July 18, 2016. He began the 2016–17 season with secondary affiliate and former team, the Colorado Eagles of the ECHL. Throughout the year, Simpson was recalled to the Rampage on multiple occasions, recording just 1 win in 9 games. He was returned to the Eagles for the playoffs, and served as backup in winning two series clinching games as Colorado claimed the Kelly Cup.

Career statistics

Regular season and playoffs

International

Awards and honours

References

External links

1992 births
Living people
Adirondack Thunder players
Bridgeport Sound Tigers players
Canadian ice hockey goaltenders
Chicago Blackhawks draft picks
Chicago Blackhawks players
Colorado Eagles players
Everett Silvertips players
Rockford IceHogs (AHL) players
San Antonio Rampage players
Ice hockey people from Edmonton
Stockton Heat players
Stockton Thunder players
Toledo Walleye players